The Bündner Oberländerschaf (also known as Grisons (French), Graubünden (German)) is a domesticated breed of sheep in Switzerland.  As of 2007, there were less than 1,100 but the population is increasing and used primarily for vegetation management.

Characteristics
The Bündner Oberländerschaf displays white, brown or silver-grey.  The head is slender and is bare.  Rams have substantial horns while ewes have small horns or are polled (hornless).  Both sexes display rather primitive behavior.  Multiple births are common.

When mature, rams weigh on average  and ewes .

References

Sheep breeds
Sheep breeds originating in Switzerland